Bianca van der Velden (born February 11, 1976 in Nijmegen) is a Dutch competitor in synchronized swimming in which she forms a duet with her twin sister Sonja.

Bianca and Sonja took part in the 2004 Summer Olympics in Athens where they finished in 13th position. At the 2005 World Championships in Montreal they became 9th, while Bianca also finished 9th in the solo routine there. At the 2007 World Championships in Melbourne they finished 9th in the technical routine and 10th in the free routine. They also qualified themselves for the 2008 Summer Olympics in Beijing.

References

1976 births
Living people
Dutch synchronized swimmers
Olympic synchronized swimmers of the Netherlands
Synchronized swimmers at the 2004 Summer Olympics
Synchronized swimmers at the 2008 Summer Olympics
Sportspeople from Nijmegen